The 2011 Meistriliiga was the 21st season of the Meistriliiga, the top Estonian league for association football clubs, since its establishment in 1992. The season began on 5 March 2011 and concluded on 5 November 2011. The defending champions Flora won their ninth league title.

Teams
Lootus finished the 2010 season in last place and were relegated to the 2011 Esiliiga as a result, ending their one-year stay in the Estonian top flight. Taking their place were Ajax, who finished the 2010 Esiliiga first among promotion-eligible clubs and third overall. They returned to the top flight after a three-year absence.

Tulevik terminated their affiliation with Flora and continued as an independent club in the II Liiga. FC Viljandi was created to ensure top level football would remain in the city of Viljandi.

In addition, the 9th place Meistriliiga club, Kuressaare, faced the 4th placed Esiliiga club, Kiviõli Tamme Auto in a two-legged play-off for a place in the Meistriliiga. Kuressaare won the play-off, 4–2 on aggregate, and thus retained their place in the league.

Stadiums and locations

League table

Results
Each team played every opponent four times, twice at home and twice away, for a total of 36 games.

First half of season

Second half of season

Relegation play-off
At season's end, the 9th place club in the Meistriliiga participated in a two-legged playoff with the runners-up of the 2011 Esiliiga for one place in the following year's competition.

Kuressaare retained their place in the league, winning 5–1 on aggregate.

Season statistics

Top scorers

Awards

Monthly awards

Meistriliiga Player of the Year
Sergei Mošnikov was named Meistriliiga Player of the Year.

See also
 2010–11 Estonian Cup
 2011–12 Estonian Cup
 2011 Esiliiga

References

External links
 Soccernet.ee 

Meistriliiga seasons
1
Estonia
Estonia